Calcium glucoheptonate is a highly water soluble mineral supplement.

References 

Calcium compounds